Vostok Island is an uninhabited coral island in the central Pacific Ocean, part of the Line Islands belonging to Kiribati. Other names for the island include Anne Island, Bostock Island, Leavitts Island, Reaper Island, Wostock Island or Wostok Island. The island was first sighted in 1820 by the Russian explorer Fabian Gottlieb von Bellingshausen, who named the island for his ship Vostok.

Geography, flora and fauna 

There is no lagoon or fresh water on the island, and no known freshwater lens. Vostok's major portion is covered with a pure stand of Pisonia trees rooted in moist peat soil one meter thick. The herbs Boerhavia repens and Sesuvium portulacastrum round out the known vegetation.

Coconut seedlings were planted on Vostok in 1922 and failed, although on the nearby islands of Caroline and Flint there are existing coconut palms.

Noteworthy fauna includes several species of seabirds, including the red-footed booby (Sula sula), great frigatebird (Fregata minor), lesser frigatebird (F. ariel), black noddy (Anous minutus), white tern (Gygis alba), masked booby (Sula dactylatra), brown booby (S. leucogaster) and brown noddy (Anous stolidus). The Polynesian rat and the azure-tailed skink (Emoia cyanura), together with coconut crabs and green turtles, completes the known land fauna.

History 

The island was first sighted in 1820 by the Russian explorer Fabian Gottlieb von Bellingshausen, who named the island for his ship Vostok (the name means "East" in Russian). Vostok was claimed by the United States under the Guano Act of 1856, but was never mined for phosphate.  It is unknown whether the island has ever been inhabited, although the presence of rats suggests that ancient Polynesians might have at least visited. No evidence of permanent settlement has ever been found.

Vostok formed part of the British Gilbert and Ellice Islands Colony, until becoming a part of newly independent Kiribati in 1979. American claims on the island were vacated in the Treaty of Tarawa in the same year.

Vostok Island is designated as the Vostok Island Wildlife Sanctuary. In 2014 the Kiribati government announced the establishment of a 12-nautical-mile fishing exclusion zone around each of the southern Line Islands (Caroline (commonly called Millennium), Flint, Vostok, Malden, and Starbuck).

Its isolated nature means it is rarely visited, save by the occasional scientist or yachter. Passengers aboard the Golden Princess see it on the ship's route from French Polynesia to Hawaii. Landing is said to be difficult, and no harbor or anchorage exists.

The dense foliage of its trees looks dark from when viewed above.  This gives the island the appearance of a mysterious black hole when seen on Google Earth which generated speculation in 2021, leading to many to believe that the island is being censored from public view on the application. Although this conclusion is easily refuted by other mapping services and publicly available images.

Photo gallery

See also 

 List of Guano Island claims
 List of islands
 Desert island

References

Notes

References

External links 
 National Geographic - Southern Line Islands Expedition, 2014
 Article at Jane's Oceania Home Page - includes a sketch map
 Article at Looking For Nemo Expedition's site - includes photo and sketch map
  - satellite photograph

Coral islands
Uninhabited islands of Kiribati
Pacific islands claimed under the Guano Islands Act
Line Islands
Islands of Kiribati
Former disputed islands
Line Islands (Kiribati)